Mark L. Ascher is an American law professor, currently the Hayden W. Head Regents Chair for Faculty Excellence, and previously the Joseph D. Jamail Centennial Chair, and the Sylvan Lang Professor, at  the University of Texas School of Law, and also previously the Ralph W. Bilby Professor at the James E. Rogers College of Law of the University of Arizona.

References

Year of birth missing (living people)
Living people
University of Texas at Austin faculty
American lawyers
Harvard Law School alumni